Events from the year 2004 in Brazil.

Incumbents

Federal government
President: Luiz Inácio Lula da Silva
Vice President: José Alencar

Governors
 Acre: Jorge Viana 
 Alagoas: Ronaldo Lessa 
 Amapa: Waldez Góes
 Amazonas: Eduardo Braga
 Bahia: Paulo Souto
 Ceará: Lúcio Alcântara
 Espírito Santo: Paulo Hartung
 Goiás: Marconi Perillo 
 Maranhão: José Reinaldo Tavares
 Mato Grosso: Blairo Maggi
 Mato Grosso do Sul: José Orcírio Miranda dos Santos
 Minas Gerais: Aécio Neves
 Pará: Simão Jatene
 Paraíba: Cássio Cunha Lima
 Paraná: Roberto Requião de Mello e Silva
 Pernambuco: Jarbas Vasconcelos 
 Piauí: Wellington Dias
 Rio de Janeiro: Rosinha Garotinho
 Rio Grande do Norte: Wilma Maria de Faria
 Rio Grande do Sul: Germano Rigotto
 Rondônia: Ivo Narciso Cassol
 Roraima: Francisco Flamarion Portela (till 10 November); Ottomar de Sousa Pinto (from 10 November)
 Santa Catarina: Luiz Henrique da Silveira 
 São Paulo: Geraldo Alckmin 
 Sergipe: João Filho
 Tocantins: Marcelo Miranda

Vice governors
 Acre: Arnóbio Marques de Almeida Júnior 
 Alagoas: Luís Abílio de Sousa Neto 
 Amapá: Pedro Paulo Dias de Carvalho 
 Amazonas: Omar José Abdel Aziz 
 Bahia: Eraldo Tinoco Melo 
 Ceará: Francisco de Queiroz Maia Júnior 
 Espírito Santo: Wellington Coimbra 
 Goiás: Alcides Rodrigues Filho 
 Maranhão: Jurandir Ferro do Lago Filho 
 Mato Grosso: Iraci Araújo Moreira 
 Mato Grosso do Sul: Egon Krakheche 
 Minas Gerais: Clésio Soares de Andrade 
 Pará: Valéria Pires Franco 
 Paraíba: Lauremília Lucena 
 Paraná: Orlando Pessuti 
 Pernambuco: José Mendonça Bezerra Filho 
 Piauí: Osmar Ribeiro de Almeida Júnior 
 Rio de Janeiro:
 Rio Grande do Norte: Antônio Jácome 
 Rio Grande do Sul: Antônio Carlos Hohlfeldt 
 Rondônia: Odaísa Fernandes Ferreira 
 Roraima: Salomão Afonso de Souza Cruz (till 10 November); Erci de Moraes (from 10 November)
 Santa Catarina: Eduardo Pinho Moreira 
 São Paulo: Claudio Lembo 
 Sergipe: Marília Mandarino 
 Tocantins: Raimundo Nonato Pires dos Santos

Events
date unknown
The Copa Petrobras São Paulo tennis tournament is established.
Tour do Brasil is established

Football clubs founded
January 1 – Sociedade Esportiva Recreativa Panambi
January 19 – Esporte Clube Tigres do Brasil
January 24 – Luverdense Esporte Clube 
February 10 – Toledo Colônia Work 
February 17 – Osvaldo Cruz Futebol Clube 
March 27 – Horizonte Futebol Clube 
April 10 – Villa Rio Esporte Clube 
May 25 – Guanabara Esporte Clube
June 10 – Paulínia FC
July 14 – Clube Esportivo Guará 
November 11 – São Domingos Futebol Clube 
November 15 – Barras Futebol Club 
November 25 – São Carlos Futebol Clube 
December 20 – São Bernardo Futebol Clube

Culture

Films
See List of Brazilian films of 2004

Literature
Cristóvão Tezza – O Fotógrafo

Music
Vinicius Cantuária – Horse and Fish
Ithamara Koorax – Cry me a River

Births
May 3 – Mel Maia, actress

Deaths
January 20 – Adão Dãxalebaradã, singer (born 1955)
July 19 – Carvalho Leite, footballer (born 1912)
September 7 – Miriam Pires, actress (born 1926)
November 8 – Sérgio Hingst, actor (born 1924)
November 20 – Celso Furtado, economist (born 1920)

See also

 2004 in Brazilian football
 2004 in Brazilian television
 List of Brazilian films of 2004

References

 
2000s in Brazil
Years of the 21st century in Brazil
Brazil
Brazil